George Adam Herman, Jr. (born April 12, 1928) is an American playwright and writer.

Biography

Early years and Education
Herman was born in Norfolk, Virginia.  He attended a parochial school and High School in Maryland, and then earned a bachelor's degree in Philosophy from Loyola College.  From 1947 to 1949, Herman also spent three summers at the Boston College School of Expressional Art on a playwrighting scholarship.  In 1954, he earned a Master of Fine Arts from Catholic University of America.

Career
Herman has taught playwrighting and has been the artist-in-residence at numerous American universities.  For 16 years he lived and worked in Hawaii on the staff of the State Superintendent of Education.  He has directed over 200 plays for numerous schools and theatres, has served as the Artistic Director for at least one theatre (the Commedia Repertory Theatre in Hawaii), and has designed sets and lighting for more than 40 productions.

While in Hawaii, Herman also worked for as a theatre columnist and drama critic.  He turned to writing novels at age 65, and has published seven novels and one children's book to date.

As a playwright, Herman has won numerous awards since 1953.  His best known play is "A Company of Wayward Saints", which has been in print continuously since it was first published in 1963.  His plays for radio, TV, and the stage have been produced around the world.  He currently has five published plays, and number of his award-winning unpublished plays are also available through his website.  Herman has received more than 30 awards for his writing.

Personal life
Herman has been married three times and has nine children.  He currently resides in Portland, Oregon.

Awards
 1953 Hartke Playwrighting Award - "The Pygmalion Effect"
 1963 McKnight Foundation Humanities Award - "A Company of Wayward Saints"
 1974 Julie Harris-Beverly Hills Theatre Award - "The Man in the Cordoban Hat"
 1976 Ayling Foundation Awards for new plays for children - "Nine Dragons"
 1980 Ayling Foundation Awards for new plays for children - "The Hidden Place"
 1985 Roberts Theatre Institute Award - "The King Has Gone to Tenebrae"
 1993 Julie Harris-Beverly Hills Theatre Award - "Pious Nine is Falling Down"

Work

Published Plays

A Company of Wayward Saints (1963)
A Smell of Cinnamon
Devil of the Second Stairs
Nine Dragons (1977)
The Hidden Place (1978)
Little Rome - Iowa (2003) ,

Books

Carnival of Saints (1994)  ,  
A Comedy of Murders (The first adventure of Leonardo da Vinci and Niccolo de Pavia) (1994)  , 
The Tears of the Madonna (Second Adventure of Leonardo da Vinci and Niccolo de Pavia) (1996)  , 
The Florentine Mourners (Third Adventure of Leonardo da Vinci and Niccolo de Pavia) (1999)  , 
The Toys of War  (Fourth Adventure of Leonardo da Vinci and Niccolo de Pavia) (2001)  , # 
Necromancer: The fifth adventure of Leonardo da Vinci and Niccolo da Pavia (2003)  
The Arno Serpent: The sixth adventure of Leonardo da Vinci and Niccolo da Pavia (2007)  , # 
Nine Dragons (2003)  , Cardinal Virtues (Seventh Adventure of Leonardo da Vinci and Niccolo da Pavia) (2012)

References

External links
 
 George Herman on Playscripts.com
 Official website

1928 births
Living people
20th-century American dramatists and playwrights
Writers from Portland, Oregon
Catholic University of America alumni
Loyola University Maryland alumni
Boston College alumni